The Mongolian Armed Forces (Mongol: ulsyn zevsegt hüchin) is the collective name for the Mongolian military and the joint forces that comprise it. It is tasked with protecting the independence, sovereignty, and territorial integrity of Mongolia. Defined as the peacetime configuration, its current structure consists of five branches: the Mongolian Ground Force, Mongolian Air Force, Construction and Engineering Forces, cyber security, and special forces. In case of a war situation, the Border Troops, Internal Troops and National Emergency Management Agency can be reorganized into the armed forces structure. The General Staff of the Mongolian Armed Forces is the main managing body and operates independently from the Ministry of Defence, its government controlled parent body.

The official holiday of their military is Men's and Soldiers' Day on 18 March, the equivalent of Defender of the Fatherland Day in Russia and PLA Day in China.

History

Mongol Empire and post-imperial 

As a unified state, Mongolia traces its origins to the Mongol Empire created by Genghis Khan in the 13th century. Genghis Khan unified the various tribes on the Mongol steppe, and his descendants eventually conquered almost the entirety of Asia, the Middle East, and parts of Eastern Europe.

The Mongol Army was organized into decimal units of tens, hundreds, thousands, and ten thousands. A notable feature of the army is that it was composed entirely of cavalry units, giving it the advantage of maneuverability. Siege weaponry was adapted from other cultures, with foreign experts integrated into the command structure.

The Mongols rarely used naval power, with a few exceptions. In the 1260s and 1270s they used seapower while conquering the Song dynasty of China, though they were unable to mount successful seaborne campaigns against Japan due to storms and rough battles. Around the Eastern Mediterranean, their campaigns were almost exclusively land-based, with the seas being controlled by the Crusader and Mamluk forces.

With the disintegration of the Mongol Empire in the late 13th century, the Mongol Army as a unified unit also crumbled. The Mongols retreated to their homeland after the fall of the Mongol Yuan dynasty, and once again delved into civil war. Although the Mongols became united once again during the reign of Queen Mandukhai and Batmongkhe Dayan Khan, in the 17th century they were annexed into the Qing dynasty.

Period under Qing Rule
Once Mongolia was under the Qing, the Mongol Armies were used to defeat the Ming dynasty, helping to consolidate Manchu Rule. Mongols proved a useful ally in the war, lending their expertise as cavalry archers. During most of the Qing dynasty time, the Mongols gave military assistance to the Manchus.

With the creation of the Eight Banners, Banner Armies were broadly divided along ethnic lines, namely Manchu and Mongol.

Bogd Khanate (1911–1919) 
In 1911, Outer Mongolia declared independence as the Bogd Khaanate under the Bogd Khan. This initial independence did not last, with Mongolia being occupied successively by the Chinese Beiyang Government, and Baron Ungern's White Russian forces. The modern precursor to the Mongolian Armed Forces was placed, with men's conscription and a permanent military structure starting in 1912.

Mongolian People's Republic

With Independence lost again to foreign forces, the newly created Mongolian People's Revolutionary Party created a native communist army in 1920 under the leadership of Damdin Sükhbaatar in order to fight against Russian troops from the White movement and Chinese forces. The MPRP was aided by the Red Army, which helped to secure the Mongolian People's Republic and remained in its territory until at least 1925. However, during the 1932 armed uprising in Mongolia and the initial Japanese border probes beginning in the mid-1930s, Soviet Red Army troops in Mongolia amounted to little more than instructors for the native army and as guards for diplomatic and trading installations.

Battles of Khalkhin Gol

The Battles of Khalkhin Gol began on 11 May 1939. A Mongolian cavalry unit of some 70–90 men had entered the disputed area in search of grazing for their horses. On that day, Manchukuoan cavalry attacked the Mongolians and drove them back across the Khalkhin Gol. On 13 May, the Mongolian force returned in greater numbers and the Manchukoans were unable to dislodge them.

On 14 May, Lt. Col. Yaozo Azuma led the reconnaissance regiment of 23rd Infantry Division, supported by the 64th Infantry Regiment of the same division, under Colonel Takemitsu Yamagata, into the territory and the Mongolians withdrew. Soviet and Mongolian troops returned to the disputed region, however, and Azuma's force again moved to evict them. This time things turned out differently, as the Soviet–Mongolian forces surrounded Azuma's force on 28 May and destroyed it. The Azuma force suffered eight officers and 97 men killed and one officer and 33 men wounded, for 63% total casualties. The commander of the Soviet forces and the Far East Front was Comandarm Grigory Shtern from May 1938.

Both sides began building up their forces in the area: soon Japan had 30,000 men in the theater. The Soviets dispatched a new Corps commander, Comcor Georgy Zhukov, who arrived on 5 June and brought more motorized and armored forces (I Army Group) to the combat zone. Accompanying Zhukov was Comcor Yakov Smushkevich with his aviation unit. Zhamyangiyn Lhagvasuren, Corps Commissar of the Mongolian People's Revolutionary Army, was appointed Zhukov's deputy.

The Battles of Khalkhin Gol ended on 16 September 1939.

World War II and immediate aftermath

In the beginning stage of World War II, the Mongolian People's Army was involved in the Battle of Khalkhin Gol, when Japanese forces, together with the puppet state of Manchukuo, attempted to invade Mongolia from the Khalkha River. Soviet forces under the command of Georgy Zhukov, together with Mongolian forces, defeated the Japanese Sixth army and effectively ended the Soviet–Japanese Border Wars.

In 1945, Mongolian forces participated in the Soviet invasion of Manchuria under the command of the Red Army, among the last engagements of World War II. A Soviet–Mongolian Cavalry mechanized group under Issa Pliyev took part as part of the Soviet Transbaikal Front. Mongolian troops numbered four cavalry divisions and three other regiments. During 1946–1948, the Mongolian People's Army successfully repelled attacks from the Kuomintang's Hui regiment and their Kazakh allies in the border between Mongolia and Xinjiang. The attacks were propagated by the Ili Rebellion, a Soviet-backed revolt by the Second East Turkestan Republic against the Kuomintang Government of the Republic of China. This little-known border dispute between Mongolia and the Republic of China became known as the Pei-ta-shan Incident.

These engagements would be the last active battles the Mongolian Army would see, until after the democratic revolution.

After the Democratic Revolution

Mongolia underwent a democratic revolution in 1990, ending the communist one-party state that had existed since the early 1920s. In 2002, a law was passed that enabled Mongolian Army and police forces to conduct UN-backed and other international peacekeeping missions abroad. In August 2003, Mongolia contributed troops to the Iraq War as part of the Multi-National Force – Iraq. Mongolian troops, numbering 180 at its peak, were under Multinational Division Central-South and were tasked with guarding the main Polish base, Camp Echo. Prior to that posting, they had been protecting a logistics base dubbed Camp Charlie in Hillah.

Then-Chairman of the Joint Chiefs of Staff, General Richard Myers, visited Ulan Baator on 13 January 2004 and expressed his appreciation for the deployment of a 173-strong contingent to Iraq. He then inspected the 150th Peacekeeping Battalion, which was planned to send a fresh force to replace the first contingent later in January 2004. All troops were withdrawn on 25 September 2008.

In June 2005, Batzorigiyn Erdenebat, the Vice Minister of National Defence, told Jane's Defence Weekly that the deployment of forces in Mongolia was changing away from its Cold War, southern-orientated against China posture. "Under Mongolia's regional development concept the country has been divided into four regions, each incorporating several provinces. The largest capital city in each region will become the regional centre and we will establish regional military headquarters in each of those cities," he said. However, at the time, implementation had been delayed.

In 2009, Mongolia sent 114 troops as part of the International Security Assistance Force to Afghanistan. The troops were sent, backing the U.S. surge in troop numbers. Mongolian forces in Afghanistan mostly assist NATO/International Security Assistance Force personnel in training on the former Warsaw Pact weapons that comprise the bulk of the military equipment available to the Afghan National Army.

In 2021, on the occasion of the 100th anniversary of the armed forces, it was awarded the Order of Genghis Khan by President Khaltmaagiin Battulga.

Peacekeeping missions

Mongolian armed forces have been performing peacekeeping missions in South Sudan, Chad, Georgia, Ethiopia, Eritrea, Congo, Western Sahara, Sudan (Darfur), Iraq, Afghanistan, and in Sierra Leone under the mandate of the United Nations Mission in Liberia. In 2005/2006, Mongolian troops also served as part of the Belgian KFOR contingent in Kosovo. From 2009 to 2010 Mongolian Armed Forces deployed its largest peace keeping mission to Chad and completed the mission successfully. In 2011, the government decided to deploy its first fully self-sustained forces to the United Nations Mission UNMISS in South Sudan. Since then Mongolian Infantry battalion has been conducting the PKO tasks in Unity State of Republic of South Sudan. In addition, Mongolian Staff officers deployed at the Force Headquarter and Sector Headquarters of the UNMISS mission. First general officer deployed in this mission as Brigade Commander in 2014.

On 17 November 2009, Deputy Assistant Secretary of Defense for Partnership Strategy and Stability Operations, James Schear had lunch with Col. Ontsgoibayar and selected troops from the 150th Peacekeeping Battalion under his command, bound for Chad on 20 November 2009. Afterwards Schear visited the Five Hills Regional Training Center, which hosts numerous combined multinational training opportunities for peacekeepers.

Other peacekeeping battalions in the Mongolian forces may include the 084th Special Task Battalion, and the 330th and 350th Special Task Battalion.

Historical Mongolian naval forces
Historically, the Mongolian Navy was one of the largest in the world, during the time of Kublai Khan, the grandson of Genghis Khan. However, most of the fleet sank during the Mongol invasions of Japan. The Mongolian Navy was recreated in the 1930s, while under Soviet rule, using it to transport oil. By 1990, the Mongolian Navy consisted of a single vessel, the Sukhbaatar III, which was stationed on Lake Khövsgöl, the nation's largest body of water by volume. The Navy was made up of 7 men (of those one knows how to swim), which meant it was the smallest navy in the world at the time. In 1997, the navy was privatized, and offered tours on the lake to cover expenses. Currently, Mongolia does not have an official Navy, but they have small border patrols on Buir Lake, patrolling the border between Mongolia and China in the lake.

Military policy

Mongolia has a unique military policy due to its geopolitical position and economic situation. Being between two of the world's largest nations, Mongolian armed forces have a limited capability to protect its independence against foreign invasions; the country's national security therefore depends strongly on diplomacy, a notable part of which is the third neighbor policy. The country's military ideal is to create and maintain a small but efficient and professional armed forces.

Organization

Higher leadership 
The military order of precedence is as follows:

President of Mongolia (Commander-in-Chief)
Minister of Defense
Deputy Ministers of Defense
Chief of the General Staff of the Armed Forces
Deputy Chiefs of the General Staff of the Armed Forces
Service branch commanders

Branches

Ground Force

The Ground Forces possess over 470 tanks, 650 Infantry Fighting Vehicles and armored personnel carriers, 500 mobile anti-aircraft weapons, more than 700 artillery and mortar and other military equipment. Most of them are old Soviet Union models designed between the late 1950s to early 1980s. There are a smaller number of newer models designed in post-Soviet Russia.

Air Force

On 25 May 1925 a Junkers F.13 entered service as the first aircraft in Mongolian civil and military aviation. By 1935 Soviet aircraft were based in the country. In May 1937 the air force was renamed the Mongolian People's Republic Air Corps. During 1939–1945 the Soviets delivered Polikarpov I-15s, Polikarpov I-16s, Yak-9s and Ilyushin Il-2s. By 1966 the first SA-2 SAM units entered service, and the air force was renamed the Air Force of the Mongolian People's Republic. The MiG-15, UTI and MiG-17 the first combat jet aircraft in the Mongolian inventory, entered service in 1970 and by the mid-1970s was joined by MiG-21s, Mi-8s and Ka-26s.

After the end of the Cold War and the advent of the Democratic Revolution, the air force was effectively grounded due to a lack of fuel and spare parts. However, the government has been trying to revive the air force since 2001. The country has the goal of developing a full air force in the future.

In 2011, the Ministry of Defense announced that they would buy MiG-29s from Russia by the end of the year, but this did not materialize. In October 2012 the Ministry of Defense returned a loaned Airbus A310-300 to MIAT Mongolian Airlines. From 2007 to 2011 the active fleet of MiG-21s was reduced. In 2013 the Air Force examined the possibility of buying three C-130J transport airplanes, manufactured by Lockheed Martin. Left without Russian aid, the Mongolian air force inventory gradually reduced to a few Antonov An-24/26 tactical airlifters and a dozen airworthy Mi-24 and Mi-8 helicopters.

On 26 November 2019 Russia donated two MiG-29 fighter aircraft to Mongolia, which then became the only combat-capable fighter jets in its air force.

Construction and Engineering Forces 

Since 1963, large-scale construction work has been a military affair, with the Council of Ministers on 8 January 1964 establishing the General Construction Military Agency under the Ministry of Defense. In addition, a large number of construction military units have been established. The work create a new construction and engineering army began in 2010. The Ministry of Defense and the General Staff of the Armed Forces have established six civil engineering units over the last 10 years.

Cyber Security Forces 
The Armed Forces Cyber Security Center has been established under the General Staff of the Armed Forces. A project to upgrade the Armed Forces' information and communication network, conduct integrated monitoring, detect cyber attacks, and install response equipment is expected to be completed in August 2021. A decision has been made to build a Data Center for the Armed Forces' Cyber Security Center. This will be the basis for the creation of a Cyber Security Force.

Special Forces 
The only Special Forces unit in Mongolia is the 084th Special Task Battalion.

Personnel

Military education 
In October 1943, the Sukhe-Bator Officers' School was opened to train personnel of the Mongolian Army in accordance with the experience of the Red Army during the Second World War. The National Defense University serves as the main educational institution of the armed forces. The NDU is composed of the following education institutions: Defense Management Academy, Defense Research Institute, Academic Education Institute, Military Institute, Military Music College, NCO College. In 1994, the MNDU maintained a border protection faculty, which would later be expanded to establish the Border Troops Institute and what would later become the Law Enforcement University of Mongolia.

Conscription 
The legal basis of conscription is the Universal Military Service Act. Men are conscripted between the ages of 18 and 25 for a one-year tour of duty. Mongolian men receive their conscription notices through their local administrative unit. Reserve service is still required up until the age of 45.

Women in the Armed Forces 
More than 20 percent of the total personnel of the Armed Forces are women, who work mainly in communications, logistics and medical sectors. In addition, female members of the Armed Forces have been active in UN peacekeeping operations. Major N. Nyamjargal was the first female member of the Armed Forces to serve as a UN-mandated military observer in Western Sahara in 2007. A total of 12 women have served in the Western Sahara and Sierra Leone.

Policies in recent years have been aimed at making female military service more equitable. Most women are assigned duties in the kitchen facilities and the barracks, as they are subject to many gender inequalities.

Military courts 
On 16 March 1921, a joint meeting of the Provisional People's Government and the members of the Central Committee of the MPRP decided to establish a "Military Judicial Office under the Ministry of Defense". In 1928, the government approved the “Charter of the Red Army Judiciary” and the Military Judiciary established under the Ministry of Justice. This was disbanded a year later and the Military College of the Supreme Court was established. It was composed of the Khovd Regional Military Court, the Eastern Military Court, and the Military Courts of the 1st Cavalry Division (Ulaanbaatar). The military court were referred to as "special courts" at the time and dealt with criminal and civil cases involving military personnel. In 1929, the Provisional Court and the General Military Court were dissolved, and the Military College of the Supreme Court was subordinated to the three former military units. The Military College was dissolved in 1954, and was re-established in 1971.

In connection with the change in the staffing, the parliament ordered in 1993 the abolition of the All-Military Special Court and the Special Military Court of First Instance, transferring the assets used by the Military Courts to the General Council of the Judiciary. All activities of the Military Court system is supervised by the Military Collegium.

Equipment

References 

''World aircraft information files Bright Star Publishing London File 332 Sheet 3

External links 

General Staff of the Mongolian Armed Forces 
Ministry of Defense 
General Intelligence Agency
Photo report on the Military Parade for the honor of National Flag of Mongolia, 2011